31 Arietis (abbreviated 31 Ari) is a binary star in the northern constellation of Aries. 31 Arietis is the Flamsteed designation. The two members of this system orbit each other with a period of 3.80 years and an eccentricity of 0.017. Both components of the system are F-type main sequence stars with a stellar classification of F7 V. The pair have an apparent visual magnitude of 5.75, which is just bright enough to be faintly visible to the naked eye. The system is located near the ecliptic, so it is subject to occultation by the Moon.

References

External links
 HR 763
 CCDM J02366 +1227
 Image 31 Arietis

016234
Binary stars
012153
Aries (constellation)
Arietis, 31
F-type main-sequence stars
0763
Durchmusterung objects